This is a list of Portuguese dishes and foods. Despite being relatively restricted to an Atlantic sustenance, Portuguese cuisine has many Mediterranean influences. Portuguese cuisine is famous for seafood. The influence of Portugal's former colonial possessions is also notable, especially in the wide variety of spices used. These spices include piri piri (small, fiery chili peppers),  black pepper and white pepper, as well as cinnamon, vanilla, clove, cumin, allspice and saffron. Olive oil is one of the bases of Portuguese cuisine, which is used both for cooking and flavouring meals. Garlic is widely used, as are herbs, such as bay leaf, coriander, oregano, thyme, rosemary and parsley, being the most prevalent. Portuguese beverages are also included in this list.

Portuguese dishes

 Bacalhau
 Bacalhau à Brás
 Bacalhau à Gomes de Sá
 Bacalhau à Zé do Pipo
 Bacalhau com natas
 Bacalhau com todos
 Bifana
 Bife a cavalo
 Cabidela
 Cafreal
 Caldeirada
 Caracóis
 Carne de porco à alentejana
 Carne de vinha d'alhos
 Carne guisada
 Cebolada 
 Chanfana
 Churrasco
 Cozido à Portuguesa
 Dobrada
 Dried and salted cod
 Empanada
 Escabeche
 Espetada
 Feijoada
 Fios de ovos
 Folar
 Francesinha
 Francesinha poveira
 Frango assado
 Galinha à Africana
 Lulas
 Migas
 Milho Frito
 Pastéis de bacalhau
 Peixinhos da horta
 Piri piri
 Portuguese grelhado
 Prego (culinary)
 Queijada
 Rojões
 Sardinhas assadas
 Torricado
 Tripas

Breads
 Bolo do caco
 Broa
 Broa de Avintes
 Portuguese sweet bread

Cheeses

 Castelo Branco cheese
 Queijo de Cabra Transmontano
 Queijo de Nisa
 Queijo do Pico
 Queijo fresco
 Requeijão
 Saloio
 Santarém cheese
 São Jorge cheese
 Serpa cheese
 Serra da Estrela cheese

Desserts and sweets

 Aletria
 Arroz doce
 Arrufada de Coimbra
 Azevia
 Baba de camelo
 Barquilhos de Setúbal
 Barriga de freira de Arouca
 Berliner – In Portugal, Berliners are slightly larger than their German counterparts, and are known as bolas de Berlim (lit. Berlin ball). The filling is always an egg-yolk based yellow cream called creme pasteleiro (lit. confectioner's cream).
 Bilharaco
 Biscoitos de Louriçal
 Bolo das Alhadas
 Bolo de arroz
 Bolo de mel
 Bolo Rei
 Bola Doce Mirandesa
 Caladinhos
 Cavacas
 Cavas de Resende
 Celestes de Santa Clara
 Chestnut pudding
 Chocolate salami
 Clarinhas de Esposende
 Delícias do Convento
 Doce de Gila
 Dom Rodrigo
 Encharcada
 Espigas Doces
 Enxovalhada de Torresmos
 Esquecidos da Guarda
 Fatias de Freixo
 Filhós
 Fofas de Faial
 Folar
 Folhados de Tavira
 Goiabada
 Guardanapos
 Lampreia de Portalegre
 Malasada
 Marmelada
 Manjar branco de Coimbra
 Marzipan
 Molotof
 Natas do Céu
 Ovos Moles de Aveiro
 Palha de Abrantes
 Pampilho
 Pão-de-ló de Ovar
 Pão-de-ló de Alfeizerão
 Papo-de-anjo
 Pastel de Feijão
 Pastel de feijão de Torres Vedras
 Pastel de nata
 Pudim Abade de Priscos
 Queijinhos do Céu
 Rabanadas
 Rebuçados de ovos
 Regueifa da Páscoa
 Roscas de amêndoa
 Salame de Chocolate
 Serradura
 Sericaia
 Tigelada
 Tortas de Azeitão
 Tortinhas
 Toucinho-do-Céu
 Travesseiros da Piriquita
 Trouxas da Malveira
 Trouxas de ovos das Caldas
 Velhote

Sausages

 Alheira
 Azaruja sausage
 Chouriço
 Chouriço de ossos
 Enchido
 Farinheira
 Linguiça
 Paio

Soups and stews
Caldo verde
Canja de galinha
 Cebolada
 Cozido à portuguesa
 Sopa da Beira
Sopa da pedra
 Sopa de castanhas
 Sopa de peixe
 Sopa de agrião e feijão (watercress and beans) 
 Sopa de tomate com ovos escalfados
 Xarém – a thick soup from Algarve, Portugal.

Beverages

 Bica
Café com cheirinho
 Galão
 Laranjada
 Mazagran

Alcoholic beverages

 Água-pé
 Aguardente
Bagaço
 Ginjinha
 Granito Montemorense
 Licor Beirão
 Liquorice stick (cocktail)
 Macieira Brandy
 Madeira Brewery
 Medronho
Nikita
Pé-de-cabra
 Poncha
Port wine
 Sagres - leading beer brand
 Super Bock – leading beer brand

Regional specialities

 Bolo do caco (Madeira)

See also

 Cataplana – a cookware item used to prepare Portuguese seafood dishes
 List of Portugal food and drink products with protected status
 Macanese cuisine – is unique to Macau and consists of a blend of southern Chinese and Portuguese cuisines
 Portuguese wine

References

 
Portugal